Rod Laver was the defending champion, but lost in the second round this year.

Marty Riessen won the title, defeating Vitas Gerulaitis 7–6(7–1), 5–7, 6–2, 6–7(0–7), 6–3 in the final.

Seeds

Draw

Final rounds

Top half

Section 1

Section 2

Section 3

Section 4

Bottom half

Section 5

Section 6

Section 7

Section 8

External links
 Main draw

U.S. Pro Indoor